Rubus ellipticus, commonly known as ainselu, golden evergreen raspberry, golden Himalayan raspberry, or yellow Himalayan raspberry, is an Asian species of thorny fruiting shrub in the rose family. It is native to China, Nepal, India, Pakistan, Indochina, and the Philippines.

Description 
Its leaves are trifoliate, elliptic, or obovate and toothed with long bristles. Its flowers are short, white, and have five petals and grow in clusters, and blooms in the Himalayas between the months of February and April. Its fruit are sweet, detachable, and highly sought after by birds and elephants.

Rubus ellipticus is sweet to the taste, though it is not commonly harvested for domestic use. The fruit perishes quickly after plucking from the thorny bush.

The bark from this plant is used for medical reasons in Tibetan villages, mainly as a renal tonic and an antidiuretic.  Its juices can also be used to treat coughs, fevers, colic and sore throat. The plant can also be used to make a bluish-purple dye.

Etymology 
The fruit has various names in South-Asian languages. It is called ainselu in Nepali, hisalu in Kumaoni, hisol in Garhwali, nyinch in Nyishi, and  sohshiah in Khasi language.

Ecology 
The golden Himalayan raspberry's origin is in the temperate Himalayas region, and is native to India, Pakistan, Nepal and China. It is found as a weed in open grasslands and rarely in forests of Himalayan states of India   e.g. It is often found in pine forests of the region.

The golden Himalayan raspberry can be found in mesic or wet forests, and have adapted to be able to live in complete shade and in full sun exposure.  As with other Rubus species, its seeds are readily distributed by birds.  It can also propagate, or asexually reproduce, itself through cutting.  It can grow in open fields or in canopies of moist forests.

The Himalayan raspberry can also support large populations of Drosophila, or fruit flies, from its rotting fruit, and its fruits are also consumed by elephants.

Invasiveness 

Rubus ellipticus is listed in the IUCN Invasive Species Specialist Group database as an Invasive species, one of the World's 100 worst invasive species.  It was first introduced in 1961 in Hawaii as an edible fruit and as an ornamental plant.

The yellow Himalayan raspberry poses a threat to native communities because it forms thick, impenetrable thickets, and competes with the native Hawaiian raspberry. Abandoned farms and lands disturbed by feral pig populations are also susceptible to invasion.  Its ability to grow tall due to its stout stems is also a threat because of its ability to establish itself within the tree canopy.  The yellow Himalayan raspberry is also a threat to native flora because it can outcompete other plants.  More specifically, it has higher photosynthetic rates, has higher Nitrogen Fixation rates, and therefore a higher photosynthetic nitrogen use efficiency (or PNUE).

The yellow Himalayan raspberry is currently only invasive on Hawaii. It is considered a noxious weed by the National Park Service and the Hawaiian Department of Agriculture.

Control strategies 

Due to its limited range, the golden Himalayan raspberry has been contained to a few stations on Hawaii.  Any new populations are to be eliminated as quickly as possible.  Control practices at Hawaii Volcanoes National Park has shown that simply identifying and removing the shrub can help dramatically reduce its invasive impact.

To fully eliminate a yellow Himalayan raspberry shrub, its roots systems must be pulled out.  The shrub shoots out roots deep underground after a fire or cutting.  Fire can be applied to the roots if the shrub has been removed by physical means.  Herbicide, such as Roundup, a common pesticide, can also be used in containing the shrub.

Other uses 

Nepal farmers have had limited success in harvesting and fermenting the aiselu fruit to produce a fruit wine.  In Sikkim, its roots are used to treat stomach pain and headaches, and its fruits are used to treat indigestion.

The fruits of golden Himalayan raspberry was recorded as rich source of phenolics, beta-carotines, ascorbic acid (vitamin C), many other important metabolites and antioxidants.

See also 
 Myrica esculenta, also known as Kafal
 Choerospondias axillaris, also known as Lapsi

References

External links 
 
 

ellipticus
Flora of Asia
Plants described in 1819
Flora of Nepal
Flora of Sikkim